Skyjacker may refer to:

A person who commits an aircraft hijacking, a form of air piracy
Sawyer Skyjacker II, an American experimental aircraft design
Skyjacker (EP), an EP by Trumans Water

See also
 Air pirate (disambiguation)
 Hijacking (disambiguation)
 Skyjack (disambiguation)
 Skyjacked (disambiguation)
 The Skyjacker's Tale (2016 film) documentary about Ishmael Muslim Ali
 Sky pirate (disambiguation)